Hadahur Music School is the first school for music in East Timor. It was founded by Australian nuns of the Mary MacKillop East Timor Mission in 2009. It lies in Becora, a quarter of the capital Dili.

Its aims are:
 To encourage and enable East Timorese of all ages to make music in the genres of their choice
 To encourage the East Timorese people to be proud of their traditional musical heritage, to enjoy it themselves and preserve it for future generations through learning and performing the indigenous East Timorese songs, instruments and dances
 To provide expert music instruction in Indigenous music, Western Classical music and Contemporary/Popular music to all interested
 To offer frequent opportunities for performance in these musical genres
 To train early childhood and school classroom teachers in music and music pedagogy and to assist them to include music instruction in their daily classroom activities
 To prepare East Timorese to a level of excellence to establish professional careers in music as composers, performers, teachers, entrepreneurs or in other capacities
 To cooperate with government and the private sector to contribute to the development of a viable music sector in East Timor.

External links 
 Website of Hadahur Music School
 Hadahur Music School at Tekee Media

Schools in Dili
Music schools in East Timor
Educational institutions established in 2009
2009 establishments in East Timor